The 1901 Vanderbilt Commodores football team represented Vanderbilt University during the 1901 Southern Intercollegiate Athletic Association football season. The Commodores were coached by Walter H. Watkins in his first year as head coach.

Before the season
Going into the season, the team was built around a veteran nucleus of John Edgerton, Walter Simmons, Hughes, Booth, and Davis. The line was light, but made up for with its aggressiveness. Starting quarterback Fred Hume weighed just 122 pounds.

Schedule

Season summary

Week 1: Kentucky State
On opening day, the Commodores defeated Kentucky State 22–0, looking much faster than the visitors.

The starting lineup was Williamson (left end), Lawler (left tackle), Hughes (left guard) Perry (center), Crutchfield (right guard),  Booth (right tackle), Simmons (right end), Hume (quarterback), Davis (left halfback), Kyle (right halfback), Tigert (fullback).

Week 2: Centre
In the second week of play, Vanderbilt beat Centre 25–0.

Week 3: Georgia
The Commodores defeated coach William A. Reynolds' Georgia Bulldogs 48–0, avenging the loss by the same score last year to Reynolds' Tar Heels.

Week 4: Auburn
Vanderbilt beat Auburn 41–0, in a game that was "extremely disappointing and slow."

Week 5: Washington University in St. Louis

The Washington University Bears gave the Commodores their only loss of the season, 12–11. Vanderbilt quarterback Fred Hume made a 50-yard gain, setting up John Edgerton's touchdown. Washington fought hard and responded with a touchdown drive, with Cassell making the score. Washington made the extra point, and went up 6–5. Bryan scored another touchdown for Vanderbilt to make the score 11–6 at the half.  Washington's Smith scored a touchdown in the second half, and Lehman kicked goal for the win.

The starting lineup was McLean (left end), Lawler (left tackle), Hughes (left guard) Perry (center), Crutchfield (right guard),  Booth (right tackle), Simmons (right end), Hume (quarterback), Bryan (right halfback), Edgerton (fullback).

Week 6: Tennessee

Vanderbilt beat Tennessee 22–0. John Edgerton scored three touchdowns and John J. Tigert scored another.

The starting lineup was McLean (left end), Lawler (left tackle), Hughes (left guard) Perry (center), Crutchfield (right guard),  Bryan (right tackle), Simmons (right end), Hume (quarterback), Tigert (left halfback), Kyle (right halfback), Edgerton (fullback).

Week 7: Sewanee
Coach Billy Suter's Sewanee Tigers fought the Commodores to a scoreless tie despite Vanderbilt gaining 367 yards. Twice the Commodores were stopped at the 1-yard line.

Week 8: University of Nashville

The 1901 team was likely the best football team in University of Nashville (Peabody) history. Coached by Charley Moran, the team defeated Sewanee 39–6 "and mopped up with about everything else." The Commodores practiced in secret for ten days in preparation. Vanderbilt faced Nashville on Thanksgiving Day and won 10–0 in front of  4 to 5,000 spectators, using "Harvard tactics." After thirty minutes of gameplay, John Edgerton scored a touchdown taking the wind out of the sails of Nashville rooters. A riot broke out downtown the next day. According to the account of the event in the Nashville Banner (repudiated in the Hustler), the trouble started when a number of Vanderbilt students "tried to paint the stone fence of the University of Nashville yellow and black."

The starting lineup was McLean (left end), Lawler (left tackle), Hughes (left guard) Perry (center), Crutchfield (right guard), Booth (right tackle), Simmons (right end), Kyle (quarterback), Tigert (left halfback), Davis (right halfback), Edgerton (fullback).

References

Vanderbilt
Vanderbilt Commodores football seasons
Vanderbilt Commodores football